The sixth season of South Park, an American animated television series created by Trey Parker and Matt Stone, began airing on March 6, 2002. The sixth season concluded after 17 episodes on December 11, 2002.

This is the only season without Kenny as a main character in most of the episodes, as he was written off in the previous season, though not completely, as he was mentioned a few times in this season. Instead, Butters primarily fills in his position as the fourth member of "the boys". In addition, Kenny did make a brief cameo in the episode "Free Hat", and had lines from "A Ladder to Heaven" to "The Biggest Douche in the Universe", where he appeared in flashbacks, and as a ghost possessing Cartman's body. He returns at the conclusion of the final episode, however. This is the last season to have 17 episodes; season 7 has 15 episodes, and seasons 8 to 16 have 14 episodes.

Voice cast

Main cast
 Trey Parker as Stan Marsh, Eric Cartman, Randy Marsh, Mr. Garrison, Clyde Donovan, Mr. Hankey, Mr. Mackey, Stephen Stotch, Jimmy Valmer, Timmy Burch, Phillip, and Kenny McCormick (possessing Cartman's body)
 Matt Stone as Kyle Broflovski, Butters Stotch, Gerald Broflovski, Stuart McCormick, Craig Tucker, Jimbo Kern, Terrance and Jesus
 Eliza Schneider as Liane Cartman, Sheila Broflovski, Shelly Marsh, Sharon Marsh, Mayor McDaniels, Carol McCormick, Wendy Testaburger, Principal Victoria and Ms. Crabtree
 Mona Marshall as Sheila Broflovski and Linda Stotch
 Isaac Hayes as Chef

Guest cast
 John Hansen as Mr. Slave ("The Death Camp of Tolerance")

Episodes

References

External links

 South Park Studios - official website with streaming video of full episodes.
 The Comedy Network - full episodes for Canada
 http://www.moviefreak.com/artman/publish/dvd_southpark_s6.shtml

 
2002 American television seasons